Snow Tower is a mountain summit located in the state capital Juneau, in the U.S. state of Alaska. It is part of the Coast Mountains.

References

Mountains of Alaska
Mountains of Juneau, Alaska
North American 2000 m summits